Juan de Rojas y Asúa (1622 – 25 November 1685) was a Roman Catholic prelate who served as Bishop of Nicaragua (1683–1685).

Biography
In 1644, Juan de Rojas y Asúa was ordained a priest of the Order of the Blessed Virgin Mary of Mercy. On 14 December 1682, he was selected by the king of Spain and confirmed on 8 March 1683 by Pope Innocent XI as Bishop of Nicaragua. On 10 April 1683, he was consecrated bishop and in January 1684, he was installed bishop.  He served as Bishop of Nicaragua until his death in on 25 November 1685 in Metapa, Nicaragua while on a pastoral visit.

References

External links and additional sources
 (for Chronology of Bishops) 
 (for Chronology of Bishops) 

17th-century Roman Catholic bishops in Nicaragua
Bishops appointed by Pope Innocent XI
1622 births
1685 deaths
People from the Province of Cuenca
Mercedarian bishops
Roman Catholic bishops of León in Nicaragua